Alperen Hearths, officially the Alperen Hearths Foundation for Education, Culture, and Solidarity or simply known as Alperens, are a far-right youth organization affiliated with the Great Unity Party in Turkey.

History 
It was established on 1 October 1992, by the order of Muhsin Yazıcıoğlu. Servet Avcı was the first chairman. In July 1994, Avcı handed over his chairmanship to Emir Kuşdemir, who later handed it to Süleyman Doğan.

During the Chechen war, aid campaigns and protests were organized by the Alperens across Turkey to support Chechnya. The visit of Boutros Boutros-Gali to Turkey was prevented by the protests of the Alperens on the grounds that the situation of Muslims in Bosnia, Palestine, Algeria and Chechnya was ignored. Süleyman Doğan handed over his chairmanship to Yavuz Ağıralioğlu in December 1995. In March 1996, the Alperens started the process of becoming the "Nizam-ı Alem Ocakları Vakfı". On 8 March 1997, Yavuz Ağıralioğlu handed over his chairmanship to Tuna Koç, who was the Aegean Region President of the organization. In February 2000, Tuna Koç, the chairman, handed over his duties to Yüksel Türkay. During this period, the name of the organization was changed to "Alperen Hearths".

Serkan Tüzün, who took office on 12 July 2006, handed over his chairmanship to Eyüp Gökhan Özekin. Özekin, who carried out important activities in the name of creating a corporate identity for the Alperen Hearths, also attended Kosovo visits with the then BBP Chairman Muhsin Yazıcıoğlu and made various contacts. Özekin, who also organized a charity night for Chechnya, handed over his duty of general chairmanship to Abdullah Gürgür on 20 December 2008. Murat Aslan, who took office in November 2015, handed over his five-year chairmanship to Samet Bağcı on 21 December 2019. Bağcı is currently the chairman of the Alperen Ocakları Education Culture and Solidarity Foundation.

Ideology 
Alperen Hearths adhere to Turkish nationalism with a mix of Sunni Islam. An ideology which is criticized by Islamists who view nationalism as a sin, and by nationalists who view religion as unimportant. The Alperens however, are different then the Grey Wolves in some aspects, including how the Alperens lean more towards religion while the Grey Wolves lean more towards nationalism. Also the Alperens claim to support that all ethnicities in Turkey, including Turks, Laz, Circassians, Kurds, and Arabs, should go hand in hand to stand up for the country, while the Grey Wolves only care for ethnic Turks. The Alperens claims to want to establish the deep love, devotion, and responsibility towards the Turkish nation by seeing all people as Adam's children, without marginalizing any group.

See also 
 Yasin Hayal
 Grey Wolves

References

1992 establishments in Turkey
Islamic organizations based in Turkey
Youth wings of political parties in Turkey
Anti-Armenianism in Europe
Anti-Armenianism in Turkey
Anti-Christian sentiment in Asia
Anti-Christian sentiment in Europe
Anti-communist terrorism
Anti-Greek sentiment
Antisemitism in Turkey
Deniers of the Armenian genocide
Far-right politics in Asia
Far-right politics in Europe
Far-right politics in Turkey
Far-right terrorism
Idealism (Turkey)
Nationalist movements in Asia
Nationalist movements in Europe
Neo-fascist organizations
Turkish nationalist organizations
Organizations established in 1992
Sunni Islamist groups
 
Armenian
Anti-communist organizations